Jodi Lynn Anderson is an American children's writer. Anderson grew up in northern New Jersey. Anderson attended college in the University of Maryland where she graduated with a BA in British Literature. She went on to get an MFA in Writing and Literature from Bennington College. She started her career in books as a book editor at HarperCollins in NYC. Since then she has gone on to write fiction for young people and had a New York Times bestselling novel. She has spent time living in Georgia and Washington DC but currently lives in Asheville, North Carolina. Anderson is married with one son.

Bibliography
May Bird
 The Ever After (2005)
 Among the Stars (2006)
 Warrior Princess (2007)
Peaches
 Peaches (2005)
 The Secrets of Peaches (2006)
 Love and Peaches (2008)
Novels
 Loser/Queen (2010)
 Tiger Lily (2012)
 The Vanishing Season (2014)
 The Moment Collector (2014)
 My Diary from the Edge of the World (2015)
 Midnight at the Electric (2017)

References

Living people
American children's writers
American women children's writers
21st-century American writers
21st-century American women writers
Writers from New Jersey
University System of Maryland alumni
Year of birth missing (living people)